Pascal Borel (born 26 September 1978) is a German football coach and former player who played as a goalkeeper. In 1999, Borel earned two caps for Germany at the U21 level.

Playing career
Borel was born in Karlsruhe. He played between 1998 and 2005 with Werder Bremen, and before that with SV Waldhof Mannheim and FC Germania Friedrichstal.

In season 2007–08, he was part of Budapest Honvéd FC, where he made eight appearances playing in the Hungarian League.

In March 2009, Borel signed with Chernomorets Burgas until the end of the season. On 4 April 2009, he made his competitive debut for the team in a match against Lokomotiv Sofia. Borel quickly became part of the main team and on 28 May 2009 he received a new contract with the club until the end of 2010–11 season. He left the club on 10 June 2011 after his contract expired. Borel ended his career at RB Leipzig.

Post-playing career
Borel worked as goalkeeper coach in VfB Stuttgart youth setup. He moved to Hannover 96 in 2014.

Honours
Werder Bremen
 Bundesliga: 2003–04
 DFB-Pokal: 2003–04
 DFB-Ligapokal finalist: 2004

References

External links
 

1978 births
Living people
German footballers
Footballers from Karlsruhe
Association football goalkeepers
Germany B international footballers
Germany under-21 international footballers
SV Waldhof Mannheim players
SV Werder Bremen II players
SV Werder Bremen players
Rot Weiss Ahlen players
Budapest Honvéd FC players
RB Leipzig players
PFC Chernomorets Burgas players
Bundesliga players
2. Bundesliga players
First Professional Football League (Bulgaria) players
German expatriate footballers
German expatriate sportspeople in Hungary
Expatriate footballers in Hungary
German expatriate sportspeople in Bulgaria
Expatriate footballers in Bulgaria